The Eagles' Nests Landscape Park (Park Krajobrazowy Orlich Gniazd) is a  protected area in south-western Poland, and one of over 120 Polish official Landscape parks. It was established in 1980, and covers much of the area of the Trail of the Eagles' Nests, marked as No. 1 on the official list of tourist trails. The trail passes by some 25 medieval castles called the Eagles' Nests, built on large, tall rocks by the order of King Casimir III the Great.

Location
The Park is shared between two voivodeships: Lesser Poland and Silesian Voivodeship or more specifically its Częstochowa County (Gmina Janów, Gmina Olsztyn) and Zawiercie County (Gmina Łazy, Gmina Ogrodzieniec).

The Park lies within the Polish Jura formation also known as the Polish Jurassic Highland or Kraków-Częstochowa Upland, stretching between the cities of Kraków, Częstochowa and Wieluń. The Polish Jura, along with its numerous medieval castles built by King Casimir (1310–1370), is visited by roughly 400,000 visitors a year. Part of the Upland belongs to the Ojców National Park, the smallest of Poland's twenty national parks, ranking among the most attractive recreational areas in the country.

Notes and references 

  Poland by Neil Wilson, Tom Parkinson, Richard Watkins, Lonely Planet
  List of castles
  Map of the castles Śląskie Voivodship
  Map of the castles Greater Poland Voivodeship

Eagle Nests
Parks in Lesser Poland Voivodeship
Częstochowa County